UoG is an abbreviation that can mean:

 University of Gdańsk
 University of Georgia
 University of Ghana
 University of Ghent
 University of Glamorgan
 University of Glasgow
 University of Gloucestershire
 University of Guadalajara
 University of Guam
 University of Guelph
 University of Gujrat
 University of Guyana
 University of Greenwich

See also
 UG (disambiguation)